Vitry-sur-Orne (literally Vitry on Orne) is a commune in the Moselle department in Grand Est in north-eastern France. It is part of the urban area of Metz.

See also
 Communes of the Moselle department

References

External links
 

Vitrysurorne
Mediomatrici